Zyklophin is a semisynthetic peptide derived from dynorphin A and a highly selective antagonist of the κ-opioid receptor (KOR). It is systemically-active, displaying good metabolic stability and blood-brain-barrier penetration. Similarly to other KOR antagonists, it has been shown to block stress-induced reinstatement of cocaine-seeking in animals. The drug is currently experimental, and thus cannot be considered safe for consumption or usage.

See also
 CERC-501
 PF-4455242
 BU09059
 ALKS-5461

References

Kappa-opioid receptor antagonists
Opioid peptides
Semisynthetic opioids